USS Buck has been the name of more than one United States Navy ship, and may refer to:

 , a ship's tender in commission from 1917 to 1918
 , a destroyer commissioned in 1939 and sunk in 1943
 , a destroyer in commission from 1946 to 1973

United States Navy ship names